Mondrian is an open source OLAP (online analytical processing) server, written in Java. It supports the MDX 
(multidimensional expressions) query language and the XML for Analysis and olap4j interface specifications. It reads from SQL and other data sources and aggregates data in a memory cache.

Mondrian is used for:
 High performance, interactive analysis of large or small volumes of information
 Dimensional exploration of data, for example analyzing sales by product line, by region, by time period
 Parsing the MDX language into Structured Query Language (SQL) to retrieve answers to dimensional queries
 High-speed queries through the use of aggregate tables in the RDBMS
 Advanced calculations using the calculation expressions of the MDX language

Mondrian History 
The first public release of Mondrian was on August 9, 2002.

See also 
 Business intelligence
 Comparison of OLAP servers

Online analytical processing
Software using the Eclipse license